The following is a list of political parties in the Soviet Union:

Russia / All-Union 
 Communist Party of the Soviet Union (established in January 1912, dissolved in August 1991)
 Left Opposition  (1923–1927)
 Workers' Truth (1921–1923)
 Workers' Group (1923–1930)
 Right Opposition (1924–1933)
 United Opposition (1926–1927)
 Left-Right Bloc (1930)
 Union of Marxist-Leninists (1932)
 Bloc of Soviet Oppositions (1932–1933)
 Anti-Party Group (1957)
 Soyuz (1990–1991)
 State Committee on the State of Emergency (1991)

Underground 
True Communists (1940)
Soviet Revolutionary Communists (Bolsheviks) (established in 1960s)
All-Russian Social-Christian Union for the Liberation of the People (1964–1967)
Left School (established in Winter 1972–1973, dissolved in January 1977)
Party of New Communists (established in Winter 1972–1973, dissolved in January 1977)
Neo-Communist Party of the Soviet Union (established in September 1974, dissolved in January 1985)

Legal 
Democratic Union (established in March 1988, the first openly proclaimed opposition party in the Soviet Union)
Liberal Democratic Party of the Soviet Union (established in March 1989, dissolved in April 1991)
 (established in June 1990, dissolved in January-February 1992)

Pro-independence parties in Union Republics (nationalists) 
 Organization of Ukrainian Nationalists (1966–1987, Ukraine)
 National United Party (1966–1987, Armenia)
 Union for National Self-Determination (1987)

Political parties
Soviet Union
 
Parties